Distilled Love is a 1920 American silent comedy film co-directed by Vin Moore and Richard Smith, and featuring Oliver Hardy, who was billed as "Babe Hardy" in this film.

Cast
 Alice Howell as The Milkmaid
 Richard Smith as The Color Blind Artist (as Dick Smith)
 Oliver Hardy as Mr. Peeble Ford (billed as Babe Hardy)
 Billy Bevan
 Fay Holderness
 Ida Mae McKenzie
 Ray Godfrey as Diving Girl (as Rae Godfrey)

Reception 
The Film Daily gave it a mainly positive review on April 11, 1920, writing: "In addition to numerous touches in which common farmyard animals appear—bits of the sort that always appeal—there are several humorous bits in this two reeler that place it in the successful class of knock-about comedies. It is just a trifle disconnected, and may need cutting in places, but as a whole it is quite certain to register."

See also
 List of American films of 1920
 Oliver Hardy filmography

References

External links

1920 films
American silent short films
American black-and-white films
1920 comedy films
1920 short films
Films directed by Vin Moore
Silent American comedy films
American comedy short films
1920s American films